The 2010 Thailand Five's  (Thai:) is an international futsal competition. It was organized by the Football Association of Thailand or the FAT. The tournament is set to be a round-robin format with all matches being held at the CentralPlaza Udon Thani in Udon thani, Thailand on 8 to 11 April 2010.

This edition will feature the host Thailand and three invited teams. The three teams that have been invited are Iran, Argentina and Uzbekistan.

Participant teams 
The 2010 Thailand Five's is following 4 teams include

Venue 
The matches are played at the CentralPlaza Udon Thani in Udon thani.

Ranking

Results 
 All times are Thailand Standard Time (UTC+07:00).

Day 1

Day 2

Day 3

References

External links 

2010
2010 in futsal
2010 in Uzbekistani football
2010 in Thai football
2009–10 in Argentine football
2009–10 in Iranian futsal